Matthias Lust (born 27 April 1970 in Heilbronn) is a German football coach and a former player.

Playing career
He made his debut as a player on the professional league level in the Bundesliga for Karlsruher SC on 12 October 1990 when he started in a game against SG Wattenscheid 09.

Coaching career

Early career
Lust started as a head coach in the youth ranks of SpVgg Unterhaching in July 2007 before being promoted to assistant coach of the first team. Lust became interim head coach when Ralph Hasenhüttl was sacked by Unterhaching in February 2010. The interim role ended when Klaus Augenthaler took the reins as head coach. Lust returned to his role as assistant coach when Augenthaler took over and continued in the role until June 2011. Lust became a youth team coach for FC Augsburg in July 2012.

On 8 May 2015 it was confirmed, that Lust was taking over Dynamo Dresden U19, alongside a role as second assistant coach belonging to the staff of the professional team and forms the interface between U19 and professionals.

Coaching record

References

1970 births
Living people
German footballers
German football managers
Stuttgarter Kickers players
Karlsruher SC players
SV Waldhof Mannheim players
1. FC Saarbrücken players
SpVgg Unterhaching players
VfL Bochum players
SpVgg Ludwigsburg players
Bundesliga players
2. Bundesliga players
Association football midfielders
3. Liga managers
Sportspeople from Heilbronn
Footballers from Baden-Württemberg